Syedi Khanji Pheer was an Indian Ismaili Dawoodi Bohra saint. He lived in the 17th century. His family settled in Udaipur, coming from Gujarat during Udaipur's establishment. He was titled Saheb-e-Hiqmatul-Marefat (master of religious philosophy and mysticism). He was the teacher of seven Dawoodi Bohra Da'is.

Legacy 
Khanji Pheer died on the 2nd of Muharram 1117 AH (1695 A.D.). His shrine (dargah) is in Udaipur, in the locality of Khanjipir, which is named after him. A gold carved plate above his shrine was written by Syedi Abdul Qadir Hakimuddin of Burhanpur. 

Several Da'is of the Dawoodi Bohra, including the current Da'i Syedna Mufaddal Saifuddin, are descended from Khanji Pheer through his daughter, Maryam.

Gallery

References

Dawoodi Bohras
Indian Muslims